Raozan Power Station is a gas-fired thermal power station in Bangladesh. It is owned and operated  by the Bangladesh Power Development Board, Government of the People's Republic of Bangladesh.

History
Construction of the power station started on 1 February 1990 and the first unit was commissioned on 31 July 1993. It was constructed and credited by the China National Machinery and Equipment Import and Export Corporation.

Technical features
The power station consists of two identical gas-fired units with initial capacity of 210 MW and generating capacity of 180 MW both.  It is supplied from the Bakhrabad and Feni gas fields, and from the Sangu offshore field.

The N210-12.9-538/538 super high pressure intermediate reheat condensing, three cylinder double exhaustion turbo set turbine, installed at the Unit 1, was manufactured by Dong Fang of China. It has rated capacity of 210 MW and a normal speed of 3,000 RPM. The turbine was delivered in July 1991.

The boiler is a DG-680/13.7-14 type of super high pressure, one intermediate re-heat cycle and single drum natural cyclic type boiler manufactured by Dong Fang of China. It has a steam generating capacity of 680 t/h generating  13.73 MPa pressured steam at the boiler outlet. At full load, it consumes 52695.4m3/h of natural gas. The efficiency of the boiler is rated at 94.93%. Transformers are manufactured by Shen Yang of China.

See also

Electricity sector in Bangladesh
List of power stations in Bangladesh

References

External links

Natural gas-fired power stations in Bangladesh
Power stations in Bangladesh